Karlo Sentić (born 3 June 2001) is a Croatian professional footballer who plays as a goalkeeper for Prva HNL side Hajduk Split.

Club career
Sentić signed a professional contract with Hajduk in 2020 February until the summer of 2024. He was loaned to second league club Varaždin for the 2021–22 season where he won promotion with his club to the Croatian First Football League.

International career 
He has been capped for various Croatian youth national teams.

References

External links

2001 births
Living people
Sportspeople from Dubrovnik
Association football goalkeepers
Croatian footballers
Croatia youth international footballers
HNK Hajduk Split II players
HNK Hajduk Split players
NK Varaždin players
First Football League (Croatia) players
Croatian Football League players